Caxias do Sul is a city in Rio Grande do Sul, Southern Brazil, situated in the state's mountainous Serra Gaúcha region. It was established by Italian immigrants on June 20, 1890. Today it is the second largest city in the state of Rio Grande do Sul. In 2020, the population of Caxias do Sul was estimated at 517,451 people, many of whom are of Italian and German descent. The demonym of the citizens of Caxias do Sul is Caxiense.

History 

The history of Caxias do Sul began before the arrival of the Italian immigrants when the region was being roamed by cattlemen and occupied by Indigenous peoples. The region was called "Indians' Field" in that period. The arrival of Italian immigrants, mostly farmers in search of a better life from the Veneto, Lombardy, Trento (northern Italy) as well as other regions in Italy, began in 1875 in Nova Milano. Although they received governmental support such as tools, supplies, and seeds, everything had to be reimbursed to the federal government.

Two years later, the colonial headquarters of the Indians' Field was given the name Caxias Colony. The town was created on July 20, 1890, and acknowledged in the same year, on August 24. Many economic cycles marked the evolution of the city throughout that century. The first one is connected to the most significant aspect of its cultural identity: the cultivation of vineyards and the production of wine, first for its own consumption, and later on, for commercialization.

On June 1, 1910, Caxias do Sul was elevated to the category of city. On the same day, the first train arrived connecting the region to the state capital. Although the immigrants were farmers, many of them worked in other economic sectors. They settled down, urbanized the region, and started a fast-paced process of industrialization.

In the countryside, subsistence agriculture concentrates on the cultivation of grapes, wheat, and corn. Home-based manufacturing started to emerge and overproduction was commercialized. Home-based manufacturing and Caxias do Sul evolved from having small home-based workshops to large scale factories, some of which are known internationally.

Nowadays, Caxias do Sul is an important city, and due to its industrious colonists, is home to vast vineyards, wineries, a varied industrial park, and a rich and dynamic market. Those attributes grant the land great importance; for such reason Caxias do Sul is often called "Pearl of the Colonies", is considered the center of the Italian presence in Southern Brazil.

Today Caxias do Sul is one of the region's central hubs, hosting some of Brazil's most diverse economies besides its size; with its industrial parks, vast vineyards, wine commerce, cattle and plantation farms give the land a further dimension.

Caxiense
A Caxiense is a citizen of the city of Caxias do Sul. A possible anglicization of Caxiense would be Caxian. Caxiense is also the name of a bus line with headquarters in Caxias do Sul. Caxiense provides transport service with a fleet of coaches to cities in the Serra Gaúcha. Caxiense also offers a bus service from Caxias do Sul to Porto Alegre and the Porto Alegre Salgado Filho International Airport.

Demographics 
The following table shows the development of the number of inhabitants according to census data of IBGE.

Languages 
Portuguese is the official national language, and thus the primary language taught in schools. Elderly people can often speak Talian, a regional language based on Venetian but also very much influenced by other Italian dialects and by Portuguese.

Geography
Caxias do Sul is a city in Rio Grande do Sul, situated in the state's mountainous Serra Gaúcha region.

Climate 
Under the Köppen climate classification, Caxias do Sul features an oceanic climate. The average annual temperature is 16 °C (60.8 °F). In July, the coldest month, the average high temperature is 17 °C (62.6 °F) and the average low is 8 °C (46.4 °F); in January, the hottest, they are 26 °C (78.8 °F) and 16 °C (60.8 °F), respectively. Frosts are common in the winter and snow can occur, but it is less common. The last significant snowfalls were recorded in August 2013, when 10–15 cm of snow fell over the city, and in July 2021.

Economy 

In Caxias do Sul, several small, medium, large and multinational companies were founded. The city is recognized as an Entrepreneurial-Exporting Hub in the country. Some of these companies are:
Marcopolo (buses and truck frames, present in six countries) 
Randon S.A. – Implementos e Participações is a mixed holding company, leader of a group of seven companies that employ a workforce of 6,6 thousand employees. They operate in the sectors of road equipment / railway wagons / specialty vehicles/ auto parts/ automotive systems, and services;
Agrale S/A which owns 4 industrial plants, being the only Brazilian company with 100% national capital making vehicles, tractors and diesel engines;
Tramontina silverware company based in neighbouring Carlos Barbosa with plants throughout Brazil;
Grendene, the biggest Brazilian manufacturer of shoes based in neighboring Farroupilha;
Todeschini, a manufacturer of furniture based in nearby Bento Gonçalves, the wine capital of Brazil;
Hyco Hidrover, a manufacturer of hydraulic cylinders for mobile applications.

Colleges and universities 

 Universidade de Caxias do Sul (UCS);
 Centro Universitário da Serra Gaúcha (FSG);
 Faculdade de Tecnologia (FTEC);
 Instituto Federal de Educação, Ciência e Tecnologia do Rio Grande do Sul (IFRS)
 Faculdade Anglo-Americano;
 Anhanguera Faculdades;
 Faculdade América Latina;
 Faculdade dos Imigrantes;
 and smaller HEIs

Culture 

Culture in Caxias do Sul was not greatly favoured by the first Italian settlers, as they were mostly involved with survival concerns in an area until then unexplored. In the beginning of the 20th century, however, there was some cultural interest developing, and some sculptors, painters and decorators made a significant career in the city and around, like as Pietro Stangherlin, Francisco Meneguzzo and the Zambelli family. They left the first examples of artworks worth of mention, specially in sacred art and building decoration. Julio Calegari and Ulysses Geremia, both photographers, also deserve close attention for their huge collections of portraits and views of the old city.

As of historical architecture, one may find a few eclectic houses built for rich families, public buildings and Neo-Gothic churches, like as the Cathedral and the Chapel of Santo Sepulcro (Sacred Tomb). The first houses of the immigrants, made of stone, and later traditional wooden buildings, nearly all disappeared as the city developed, but some survive in the rural area, as well as many old chapels. Current laws protect every building older than 50 years, but many have been destroyed or altered, despite official protection.

The city nowadays has many intensely active museums and cultural centers, both private and official, and the Universidade de Caxias do Sul (UCS) which sponsors an art gallery, a museum, a huge library and a symphonic orchestra.

The city is hosting the 2022 Summer Deaflympics between May 1 to 15, 2022, postponed two times due to the COVID-19 pandemic, becoming the first ever Deaflympics to be ever held in South America and the Latin America.

Tourism and recreation 

The city has many tourist attractions: museums, churches, culture, music and all types of leisure activities. Nature can be found in the city and the surroundings.

The city also hosts the National Grape and Wine Festival, which celebrates the Italian heritage. It's one of the most famous events in the country and it's called Festa da Uva, when lots of merrymaking, wine-drinking, grapes and people animate the month of February, every two years (on even-numbered years). Visitors may eat cheese, grapes and various Brazilian wines. Visitors interested in the regions wine can also visit the Château Lacave Castle, a 6th Century-style medieval structure that currently functions as a winery. Caxias do Sul is also one of the four settlements along the Caminhos da Colônia scenic tourist route in the Serra Gaúcha.

Air transport is made through Hugo Cantergiani Regional Airport, with a runway measuring 1,939 meters in length, which accommodates Boeing 737-800 and Embraer 195E2 aircraft with capacities for 186 and 136 passengers respectively, with capacity to operate aircraft of up to 200 seats and annual capacity of 600 thousand passengers.

Football teams 

Caxias do Sul is home to the S.E.R. Caxias and Juventude football clubs. Even though both teams have claimed the Campeonato Gaúcho, Juventude has accomplished more at a national level, having played in the first division of the Campeonato Brasileiro for more than fifteen seasons and winning the 1999 edition of the Copa do Brasil. Caxias has been playing in the fourth division since 2016. Juventude made it back into the first division in 2020. Juventude has the third-largest fan base in the state, just behind the two major teams of the state capital city, Porto Alegre.

Sister city 
 Little Rock, Arkansas, United States

Notable people
Tite, the head coach of the Brazil national football team
Alex Telles, football player
Everton Giovanella, football player
Thaisa Serafini, squash player
André Todescato, former football player

See also 

 São Romédio Community
 Pietro Nosadini
 Municipal Museum of Caxias do Sul
 Historic Center of Caxias do Sul

References

External links 

City Hall of Caxias do Sul
Street Map of Caxias do Sul
Local Newspaper "O Pioneiro" (The Pioneer)
The University of Caxias do Sul
Juventude Soccer Club
S.E.R. Caxias Soccer Club
Caxias Bus Station and Schedules
Caxias do Sul Tourist Guide
Official Festa da Uva Site (The Grape Festival)
Chateau Lacave Castle

 
1890 establishments in Brazil
Populated places established in 1890
Municipalities in Rio Grande do Sul